Glenn Edward Lippman (born December 1, 1929) was a Canadian football player who played for the Edmonton Eskimos. He won the Grey Cup with the Eskimos in 1954. Lippman was born in Texas and attended Texas A&M University.

Inducted to the Alberta Sports Hall of Fame and Museum in 2007 as a member of the 1954-1956 Edmonton Eskimos Football Teams.

References

1929 births
Living people
Edmonton Elks players
People from Yoakum, Texas